The individual eventing event, part of the equestrian program at the 2004 Summer Olympics, was held from 15 to 18 August 2004 in the Olympic Equestrian Centre on the outskirts of Markopoulo in the Attica region of Greece.  Like all other equestrian events, the eventing competition was mixed gender, with both male and female athletes competing in the same division.

For the first time, there was two rounds of jumping. Both rounds counted toward the individual results. After the first round, the final team placings were determined. Then the top 25 pairs ( limited to three per nation ) contested a second jumping round, the results from this were added to the riders scores to determine the final individual results.

Medalists

Bettina Hoy
The German Bettina Hoy was initially awarded first place.  During the first jumping phase, she received 14 time penalty points in an otherwise flawless round.  This put her in eighth place going into the final phase.  The Germans appealed those points, noting that the time on which the points had been assigned (the time from when Hoy had first crossed the starting line) was not the same time as the time displayed on the stadium clock and which Hoy had thought was the official time.  The clock had been reset and displayed the time from when Hoy had crossed the starting line the second time, which was when she began her jumps.  These points were then rescinded by the Jury of Appeal, which put Hoy in second place only 2.20 points behind the then-leader.  In the final jumping phase, Hoy moved into first place and was awarded the gold medal on 18 August.  The Court of Arbitration for Sport ruled on 21 August that the appeal had been incorrectly upheld and ordered that the 14 points be returned to Hoy's score.  This stripped her of her medal and put her in ninth place.

Results
The total score for each horse and rider was the sum of the total penalty points earned in the various phases of competitions.  The pair with the lowest number of penalty points was victorious.

Standings after Dressage
For the dressage portion of the competition, horse and rider pairs performed series of movements that were evaluated by judges.  Judges gave marks of 0 to 10 for each movement, subtracting points for errors.  The score for each judge was represented by a percentage of marks possible that were gained.  Scores from the three judges were averaged for an overall percentage.  This was then subtracted from 100 and multiplied by 1.5 to determine the number of penalty points awarded for the round.

Standings after Dressage and Cross-Country
In the cross country phase, each pair had to traverse an obstacle course spread over a track of approximately 5.57 kilometres.  The optimum time for the course was 9 minutes, 46 seconds.  Pairs received .4 penalty points for every second beyond that time, up to a limit of 19 minutes and 32 seconds.  Any pair that had not finished in that time was eliminated.

Penalty points were also assessed for disobedience faults at obstacles and for falls.  Disobedience faults incurred 20 penalty points, rider falls incurred 65, and horse falls eliminated the pair.  The total penalty points from cross country were added to those incurred in phase 1, dressage, for a two-round total.

Standings after Show jumping round one
In show jumping, pairs received 4 penalty points for each obstacle knocked down, 4 penalty points for the horse's first disobedience, and 8 penalty points for the rider's first fall.  They also received 1 penalty point for each second over the optimum time.

They could be eliminated for a second disobedience, the rider's second fall, the horse's first fall, or taking more than twice the optimum time to finish the course.  No pairs were eliminated in any of these fashions, though one team did not start and two more withdrew.

Final results after Jumping final
A second round of jumping was used to determine final rankings.  25 pairs of horses and riders qualified, but only three from each NOC were allowed to compete.

As before, pairs received 4 penalty points for each obstacle knocked down, 4 penalty points for the horse's first disobedience, and 8 penalty points for the rider's first fall.  They also received 1 penalty point for each second over the optimum time.

They could be eliminated for a second disobedience, the rider's second fall, the horse's first fall, or taking more than twice the optimum time to finish the course.

Final rankings
Four pairs did not qualify for the final jumping because three other pairs from their team had already qualified.  Those four pairs have their positions after phase three in parentheses.

 Leslie Law riding Shear l'Eau, Great Britain
 Kimberly Severson riding Winsome Adante, United States
 Philippa Funnel riding Primmore's Pride, Great Britain
 Jean Teulere riding Espoir de la Mare, France
 Hinrich Romeike riding Marius, Germany
 Amy Tryon riding Poggio II, United States
 Heelan Tompkins riding Glengarrick, New Zealand
 Nicolas Touzaint riding Galan de Sauvagere, France
 Bettina Hoy riding Ringwood Cockatoo, Germany
 Constantin van Rijckevorsel riding Withcote Nellie, Belgium
 Rebel Morrow riding Oaklea Groover, Australia
 Darren Chiacchia riding Windfall 2, United States
 Phillip Dutton riding Nova Top, Australia
 Andreas Dibowski riding Little Lemon, Germany
 Matthew Grayling riding Revo, New Zealand
 Karin Donckers riding Gormley, Belgium
 Magnus Gallerdal riding Keymaster, Sweden
 Blyth Tait riding Ready Teddy, New Zealand
 Harald Ambros riding Miss Ferrari, Austria
 Mary King riding King Solomon III, Great Britain
 Mark Kyle riding Drunken Disorderly, Ireland
 Jaroslav Hatla riding Jennallas Boy, Czech Republic
 Niall Griffin riding Lorgaine, Ireland
 Giovanni Menchi riding Hunefer, Italy
 Didier Courrèges riding Debat d'Estruval, France
 Frank Ostholt riding Air Jordan, Germany..........(14th after three rounds)
 Jeanette Brakewell riding Over to You, Great Britain..........     (18th after three rounds)
 John Williams riding Carrick, United States..........     (21st after three rounds)
 Julie Richards riding Jacob Two Two, United States..........    (23rd after three rounds)
 Cedric Lyard riding Fine Mervielle, France
 Daniel Jocelyn riding Silence, New Zealand
 Susan Shortt riding Just Beauty Queen, Ireland
 Jennifer Eicher riding Agent Mulder, Switzerland
 Sara Algotson riding Robin des Bois, Sweden
 Stefano Brecciaroli riding Cappa Hill, Italy
 Tim Collins riding Delton Magna, Bermuda
 Hendrik Degros riding Mr. Noppus, Belgium
 Stuart Tinney riding Jeepster, Australia
 Kamil Rajnert riding Marnego, Poland
 Michael Winter riding Balista, Canada
 Bruce Mandeville riding Larissa, Canada
 Linda Algotsson riding Stand By Me, Sweden
 Dolf Desmedt riding Bold Action, Belgium
 Raul Senna riding Super Rocky, Brazil
 Harald Siegl riding Gigant 2, Austria
 Carlos Grave riding Laughton Hills, Portugal
 Rafael Gouveia Jr. riding Mozart, Brazil
 Fabio Magni riding Vent d'Arade, Italy
 Sasha Harrison riding All Love du Fenaud, Ireland
 Sergio Marins riding Rally LF, Brazil
 Pongsiree Bunluewong riding Eliza Jane, Thailand
 Andrzej Pasek riding Dekalog, Poland
 Eddy Stibbe riding Dusky Moon, Netherlands Antilles
 Andre Paro riding Land Heir, Brazil
 Garry Roque riding Waikura, Canada
 Susanna Bordone riding Ava, Italy
 Andrew Hoy riding Mr Pracatan, Australia
 Harald Riedl riding Foxy XX, Austria
 Remo Tellini riding Especial Reserve, Brazil
 Heidi Antikatzides riding Michaelmas, Greece
 Andrew Nicholson riding Fenicio, New Zealand
 Edmond Gibney riding Kings Highway, Ireland
 Pepo Puch riding Banville d'Ivoy, Croatia
 Hawley Bennett riding Livingstone, Canada
 Marisa Cortesi riding Peppermint III, Switzerland
 Pawel Spisak riding Weriusz, Poland
 Ian Roberts riding Mata-riki, Canada
 Margit Appelt riding Ice on Fire, Austria
 William Fox-Pitt riding Tamarillo, Great Britain (did not finish)
 Ingrid Klimke riding Sleep Late, Germany (did not finish)
 Olivia Bunn riding Top of the Line, Australia (did not finish)
 Arnaud Boiteau riding Expo du Moulin, France (did not finish)
 Joris Vanspringel riding Over and Over, Belgium (did not finish)
 Andreas Zehrer riding Raemmi Daemmi, Austria (did not finish)
 Viorel Bubau riding Carnaval, Romania (did not finish)

References

External links
 Athens2004.com

Individual eventing